Brian Sweeney (born 27 March 1961) is a Canadian sailor. He competed in the Tornado event at the 1984 Summer Olympics.

References

External links
 

1961 births
Living people
Canadian male sailors (sport)
Olympic sailors of Canada
Sailors at the 1984 Summer Olympics – Tornado
Sportspeople from Boston